The Philippine House Committee on Veterans Affairs and Welfare, or House Veterans Affairs and Welfare Committee, is a standing committee of the Philippine House of Representatives.

Jurisdiction 
As prescribed by House Rules, the committee's jurisdiction is on the welfare of war veterans, veterans of military campaigns, military retirees, and their surviving spouses and other beneficiaries.

Members, 18th Congress

Historical members

18th Congress

Member for the Majority 
 Rodolfo Albano (LPGMA)

See also 
 House of Representatives of the Philippines
 List of Philippine House of Representatives committees

Notes

References

External links 
House of Representatives of the Philippines

Veterans Affairs and Welfare
Veterans' affairs in the Philippines